Hugh Johnson may refer to:

Hugh Johnson (cinematographer) (died 2015), Irish cinematographer and film director
Hugh Johnson (wine writer) (born 1939), British wine writer
Hugh Johnson, carriage-maker in Detroit, 1890s, see E-M-F Company
Hugh Samuel Johnson (1881–1942), American general and NRA administrator in 1933-34

See also
Hugh Johnston (disambiguation)